Habrosyne albipuncta is a moth in the family Drepanidae. It is found in Taiwan, China (Fujian, Sichuan, Yunnan), Vietnam, Thailand and Myanmar. 

Habrosyne Albipunctas are also  nocturnal  meaning they sleep during the day and are awake at night.

Subspecies
Habrosyne albipuncta albipuncta (Taiwan)
Habrosyne albipuncta angulifera (Gaede, 1930) (Vietnam, Thailand, Myanmar, China: Fujian, Sichuan, Yunnan)

References

Thyatirinae
Moths described in 1911